MS Estonia was a cruiseferry built in 1980 for the Finnish company Rederi Ab Sally  by Meyer Werft, in Papenburg West Germany.
She was employed on ferry routes between Finland and Sweden by various companies (first Viking Line, then EffJohn) until 1993, when she was sold to Nordström & Thulin for use on Estline's Tallinn–Stockholm route. The ship's sinking on 28 September 1994, in the Baltic Sea between Sweden, Finland and Estonia, was one of the worst peacetime maritime disasters of the 20th century, claiming 852 lives.

Construction
The ship was originally ordered from Meyer Werft by a Norwegian shipping company led by Parley Augustsen with intended traffic between Norway and Germany. At the last moment, the company withdrew their order and the contract went to Rederi Ab Sally, one of the partners in the Viking Line consortium (SF Line, another partner in Viking Line, had also been interested in the ship).

Originally the ship was conceived as a sister ship to Diana II, built in 1979 by the same shipyard for Rederi AB Slite, the third partner in Viking Line.

Meyer Werft had constructed a large number of ships for various Viking Line partner companies during the 1970s. The construction of the ship's bow consisted of an upwards-opening visor and a car ramp that was placed inside the visor when it was closed. An identical bow construction had also been used in Diana II.

Service history

Estonia previously sailed as Viking Sally (1980–1990), Silja Star (1990–1991), and Wasa King (1991–1993).

Viking Line

On 29 June 1980, Viking Sally was delivered to Rederi Ab Sally, Finland and was put into service on the route between Turku, Mariehamn and Stockholm (during summer 1982 on the Naantali–Mariehamn–Kapellskär route). She was the largest ship to serve on that route at the time. As with many ships, Viking Sally suffered some mishaps during her Viking Line service, being grounded in the Åland Archipelago in May 1984 and suffering some propeller problems in April of the following year. In 1985 she was also rebuilt with a "duck tail". In 1986, a passenger was murdered on board. In 1987, another murder and attempted murder took place. The latter remains unsolved.
Rederi Ab Sally had been experiencing financial difficulties for most of the 1980s. In late 1987, Effoa and Johnson Line, the owners of Viking Line's main rivals Silja Line, bought Sally. As a result of this, SF Line and Rederi AB Slite forced Sally to withdraw from Viking Line. Viking Sally was chartered to Rederi AB Slite to continue on her current traffic for the next three years.

EffJohn
When her charter ended in April 1990, Viking Sally had an unusual change of service. She was painted in Silja Line's colours, renamed Silja Star and placed on the same route that she had plied for Viking Line: Turku–Mariehamn–Stockholm. The reason for this was that Silja's new ship for Helsinki–Stockholm service was built behind schedule and one of the Turku–Stockholm ships, Wellamo, was transferred to that route until the new ship was complete in November 1990. Also in 1990 Effoa, Johnson Line and Rederi Ab Sally merged into EffJohn.

The following spring Silja Star began her service with Wasa Line, another company owned by EffJohn. Her name was changed to Wasa King and she served on routes connecting Vaasa, Finland to Umeå and Sundsvall in Sweden. It has been reported that the Wasa King was widely considered to be the best behaving ship in rough weather to have sailed from Vaasa.

Estline
In January 1993, at the same time when EffJohn decided to merge Wasa Line's operations into Silja Line, Wasa King was sold to Nordström & Thulin for use on Estline's Tallinn–Stockholm traffic under the name Estonia. The actual ownership of the ship was rather complex, in order for Nordström & Thulin to get a loan to buy the ship. Although Nordström & Thulin was the company which bought the ship, her registered owner was Estline Marine Co Ltd, Nicosia, Cyprus, which chartered the ship to E.Liini A/S, Tallinn, Estonia (daughter company of Nordström & Thulin and ESCO), which in turn chartered the ship to Estline AB. As a result, the ship was actually registered in both Cyprus and Estonia.

As the largest Estonian-owned ship of the time, the Estonia symbolized the independence that her namesake regained after the collapse of the Soviet Union.

Decks and facilities
The MS Estonia consisted of 11 decks, counting from the lowest (0) to the highest (10). Passenger facilities were located on decks 6, 5, 4, and 1, while the crew members occupied decks 8 and 7. Decks 2 and 3 were dedicated to cargo.

As Viking Sally

Sinking

Estonia sank on Wednesday, 28 September 1994, between about 00:50 and 01:50 (UTC+2) as the ship was crossing the Baltic Sea, en route from Tallinn, Estonia, to Stockholm, Sweden.

The official report concluded that the bow door had separated from the vessel, pulling the ramp ajar. The ship was already listing because of poor cargo distribution, and the list increased rapidly, flooding the decks and the cabins.  Power soon failed altogether, inhibiting search and rescue, and a full-scale emergency was not declared for 90 minutes. Of the 989 on board, 138 were rescued. The report criticised primarily the ship's construction, as well as the passive attitude of the crew, failing to notice that water was entering the vehicle deck, delaying the alarm, and providing minimal guidance from the bridge.

The sinking was one of the worst maritime disasters of the 20th century. It is one of the deadliest peacetime sinkings of a European ship, after the RMS Titanic (1912) and the RMS Empress of Ireland (1914), and the deadliest peacetime shipwreck to have occurred in European waters, with 852 lives lost. There is a memorial for the event in Tallinn.

See also
 List of RORO vessel accidents
 List of accidents and disasters by death toll
 List of shipwrecks in 1994
 Sinking of the MS Estonia

References

Cited sources

External links 

The Ferry Site: Images of MS Estonia (when it was named Viking Sally and Silja Star)
A Sea Story (from The Atlantic)

 
Ferries of Estonia
Cruiseferries
Ships built in Papenburg
1980 ships